Nechama Leibowitz (September 3, 1905 – April 12, 1997 ) was a noted Israeli Bible scholar and commentator who rekindled interest in Bible study.

Biography
Nechama Leibowitz was born to an Orthodox Jewish family in Riga two years after her elder brother, the philosopher Yeshayahu Leibowitz. The family moved to Berlin in 1919. In 1930, Leibowitz received a doctorate from the University of Marburg for her thesis, Techniques in the Translations of German-Jewish Biblical Translations.  That same year 1930, she immigrated to Mandate Palestine with her husband Yedidya Lipman Lebowitz. She taught at a religious Zionist teachers' seminar for the next  twenty-five years. In 1957 she began lecturing at Tel Aviv University, and became a full professor eleven years later. She also gave classes at the Hebrew University of Jerusalem and other educational institutions around the country. In addition to her writings, Leibowitz commented on the Torah readings regularly for the Voice of Israel radio station.

Her husband, Yedidya Lipman Leibowitz, was also her uncle and they did not have any children. At her funeral, her nephew said that he is like a son to her and many of her students said kaddish for her together with her nephew. She is seen as a great religious role model for young religious children in Israel, and the Ne'emanei Torah Va'Avodah organization has encouraged the public school system in Israel to incorporate her into the selection of biographies that are studied by Israeli children in primary schools.

Study sheets
In 1942, Leibowitz began mailing out stencils of questions on the weekly Torah reading to anyone who requested them. These worksheets, which she called gilyonot (pages)  would be sent back to her, and she would personally review them and return them with corrections and comments. They became very popular and in demand by people from all sectors of Israeli society.  In 1954, Leibowitz began publishing her "Studies", which included many of the questions that appeared on her study sheets, along with selected traditional commentaries and her own notes on them. Over time, these studies were collected into five books, one for each book of the Torah.
These books were subsequently translated into English by Rabbi Dr. Aryeh (Laibel/Leonard) Newman.

Teaching style
When asked to describe her methods she replied, "I have no derech... I only teach what the commentaries say.  Nothing is my own.”   She was noted for her modest demeanor coupled with wry wit, and always preferred the title of "teacher" over the more prestigious "professor." In accordance with her request, "מורה" (morah, "teacher") is the only word inscribed on her tombstone, other than her name and dates. She was strict on marking mistakes in Hebrew test papers, and hated the code-switching "Heblish" of some anglophone immigrants.

Awards and recognition
 In 1956, Leibowitz was awarded the Israel Prize in education, for her work in furthering understanding and appreciation of the Bible.
 In 1983, she was a co-recipient (jointly with Ephraim Elimelech Urbach) of the Bialik Prize for Jewish thought.

Published works

 ʻIyunim be-Sefer Bereshit : be-ʻiḳvot parshanenu ha-rishonim ṿeha-aḥaronim, 1966; English: Studies in Bereshit (Genesis) in the context of ancient and modern Jewish Bible commentary, 1971
 ʻIyunim be-Sefer Shemot: be-ʻiḳvot parshanenu ha-rishonim ṿeha-aḥaronim, 1969; Eng. Studies in Shemot (Exodus), 1976
 ʻIyunim be-Sefer Yayikra: be-ʻiḳvot parshanenu ha-rishonim ṿeha-aḥaronim, 1982; Eng. Studies in Vayikra (Leviticus), 1980
 ʻIyunim be-Sefer BaMidbar: be-ʻiḳvot parshanenu ha-rishonim ṿeha-aḥaronim, 1994; Eng. Studies in Bamidbar (Numbers), 1980
 ʻIyunim be-Sefer Devarim: be-ʻiḳvot parshanenu ha-rishonim ṿeha-aḥaronim, 1996; Eng. Studies in  Devarim (Deuteronomy), 1980
 Torah insights, 1995
 Studies on the Haggadah from the teachings of Nechama Leibowitz, 2002

See also 
List of Israel Prize recipients
List of Bialik Prize recipients
Women of Israel

References

Further reading
 Leah Abramowitz, Tales of Nehama: Impressions of the Life and Teaching of Nehama Leibowitz. Gefen Publishing House, 2003. .
 Shmuel Peerless, To Study and to Teach: The Methodology of Nechama Leibowitz. Urim Publications, 2005. .
 Yael Unterman, "Nehama Leibowitz: Teacher and Bible Scholar." Urim Publications, 2009. 
 Hayuta Deutsch, Nehama: The Life of Nehama Leibowitz Yedioth Ahronoth and Chemed Books, 2008

External links
 Biography of Nechama Leibowitz by the Jewish Agency
 Nechama Leibowitz's insights on the parsha - discussions on the weekly Torah portion
  Review of Iyunim
The gilyonot, collected  on sefaria
Iyunim with suggested answers, Rabbi Mordechai Shpigelman,

1905 births
1997 deaths
Writers from Riga
People from the Governorate of Livonia
Jewish biblical scholars
German biblical scholars
Israeli biblical scholars
Bible commentators
Jewish educators
Israeli educators
Israeli women educators
Orthodox Jews in Mandatory Palestine
Israeli Orthodox Jews
Latvian Orthodox Jews
German Orthodox Jews
Israeli people of Latvian-Jewish descent
Latvian emigrants to Germany
German emigrants to Mandatory Palestine
Israel Prize in education recipients
Israel Prize women recipients
Humboldt University of Berlin alumni
Tel Aviv University alumni
Female biblical scholars
20th-century Jewish biblical scholars
Women rabbis and Torah scholars
Hochschule für die Wissenschaft des Judentums alumni
Jewish women writers